Tsundimakhi (Dargwa: ЦIундимахьи) is a rural locality (a selo) in Dubrimakhinsky Selsoviet, Akushinsky District, Republic of Dagestan, Russia. The population was 356 as of 2010. There are 2 streets.

Geography 
Tsundimakhi is located 5 km southeast of Akusha (the district's administrative centre) by road, on the Gandara River. Khazhnimakhi is the nearest rural locality.

References 

Rural localities in Akushinsky District